Events from the year 1976 in art.

Events
 July–August – Articles by Geraldine Norman in The Times (London) expose a number of paintings attributed to Samuel Palmer as the work of Tom Keating, which he does not deny.
 Completion of the Cubist-influenced Church of the Holy Trinity, Vienna, by Fritz Wotruba.
 Collection de l'art brut ("Collection of outsider art") established in Lausanne, Switzerland.

Awards
 Archibald Prize: Brett Whiteley – Self Portrait in the Studio
 John Moores Painting Prize - John Walker for "Juggernaut with plume - for P Neruda"

Exhibitions
 25 May – Opening of exhibition of color photography by William Eggleston at the Museum of Modern Art, New York.
 21 July – Opening of P.S.1 Contemporary Art Center in Long Island City, New York. The inaugural exhibition Rooms presents in-situ works and installations by around 80 artists from the United States and abroad.
 20 September until 21 November – "Two Centuries of Black American Art" curated by David Driskell at the Los Angeles County Museum of Art (LACMA) in Los Angeles,  California - then traveled to; the High Museum of Art in Atlanta, Georgia (8 January, 1977–20 February, 1977), the Dallas Museum of Fine Arts in Dallas, Texas (30 March 30, 1977–15 May, 1977), and the Brooklyn Museum (25 June, 1977–21 August, 1977).

Works

 Vito Acconci – The Red Tapes
 Judy Baca and 400 community artists – Great Wall of Los Angeles (mural)
 Francis Bacon – Triptych
 Jennifer Bartlett – Rhapsody (completed)
 Pye Engström – Efter badet
 Christo and Jeanne Claude – "Running Fence" in Sonoma County and Marin County, California, United States
Jimmy Carter Peanut Statue
 Nabil Kanso – Faust (paintings, 1976 through 1979)
 Bernard Kirschenbaum – Way Four
 R. B. Kitaj – From London
 Henry Moore – Three Piece Reclining Figure Draped (Massachusetts Institute of Technology)
 Susan Rothenberg – Butterfly
 Robert Ryman – Untitled (pastel and graphite on plexiglas with steel, 126 cm2)
 Douglas Senft – Awning (sculpture, Portland, Oregon)
 Jamie Wyeth – Portrait of Andy Warhol

Films
Blackwood

Births
 4 January – Shiro Amano, Japanese manga artist
 27 January – Zoriah Miller, American photographer
 13 February – Martin Sastre, Uruguayan media artist
 3 April – Carl Hammoud, Swedish painter
 30 April – Tomokazu Matsuyama, Japanese artist 
 10 June – Tai Shani, British artist

Deaths

January to March
 1 February – Hans Richter, German painter, graphic artist, avant-gardist, film-experimenter and producer (b. 1888)
 2 February – Zlatyu Boyadzhiev, Bulgarian painter (b. 1903)
 12 February – Charles Jourdan, French fashion designer (b. 1883)
 18 February – Wallace Berman, American painter and illustrator (b. 1926)
 23 February – L. S. Lowry, English painter (b. 1887)
 February – Kate Lechmere, English painter associated with the Vorticists and milliner (b. 1887)
 3 March – Pierre Molinier, French painter and photographer (b. 1900)
 12 March – Jacques Carlu, French architect and designer (b. 1890)
 22 March – John McLaughlin, American hard-edge painter (b. 1898)
 25 March – Josef Albers, German artist, mathematician and educator (b. 1888)
 31 March – Paul Strand, American photographer and filmmaker (b. 1890)

April to June
 1 April – Max Ernst, German painter, sculptor, graphic artist, and poet (b. 1891).
 22 April
 Stanley Cursiter, Scottish painter and curator (b. 1887).
 Jeanne Mammen, German painter (b. 1890)
 24 April – Mark Tobey, American abstract expressionist painter (b. 1890)
 11 May – Alvar Aalto, Finnish architect and designer (b. 1898)
 28 May – Steffan Danielsen, Faroese painter (b. 1922)
 24 June – Imogen Cunningham, American photographer (b. 1883)
 27 June – Albert Dubout, French cartoonist, illustrator, painter, and sculptor (b. 1905)

July to December
 5 July – Frank Bellamy, English comics artist (b. 1917)
 24 July – Afro Basaldella, Italian painter (b. 1912)
 16 September – Cecil Thomas, English bronze sculptor and medallist (b. 1885)
 23 September – Anna Zinkeisen, British artist (b. 1901)
 22 October - Edward Burra, British artist  (b. 1905) 
 31 October – Eileen Gray, Irish furniture designer and architect (b. 1878)
 11 November – Alexander Calder, American sculptor and multi media artist  (b. 1898)
 18 November – Man Ray, American artist and photographer (b. 1890)
 11 December – Elmyr de Hory, Hungarian-born painter and art forger (b. 1906)
 31 December – Sándor Bortnyik, Hungarian painter and graphic designer (b. 1893)

Full date unknown
 Mariano Andreu, Spanish painter, enamelling master, sculptor and stage designer (b. 1888)
 François Ozenda, French painter (b. 1923)

See also
 1976 in fine arts of the Soviet Union

References

 
Years of the 20th century in art
1970s in art